Saturn LXIV, provisionally known as S/2004 S 34, is a natural satellite of Saturn. Its discovery was announced by Scott S. Sheppard, David C. Jewitt, and Jan Kleyna on October 8, 2019 from observations taken between December 12, 2004 and March 21, 2007. It was given its permanent designation in August 2021.

Saturn LXIV is about 3 kilometres in diameter, and orbits Saturn at an average distance of 24.299 Gm in 1,414.59 days, at an inclination of 166° to the ecliptic, in a retrograde direction, and with an eccentricity of 0.235.

References

Norse group
Irregular satellites
Moons of Saturn
Discoveries by Scott S. Sheppard
Astronomical objects discovered in 2019
Moons with a retrograde orbit